Jack Juggler (full title: A New Interlude for Children to Play named Jack Juggler, both Witty, Very Pleasant, and Merry) is an anonymous sixteenth-century comic interlude, considered to be one of the earliest examples of comedy in English alongside Ralph Roister Doister and Gammer Gurton's Needle. The play is believed to have been written sometime between 1553 and 1561 and was first published in 1562. The author of the play is uncertain, however it has been proposed to be the work of the London schoolmaster, Nicholas Udall. As the full title indicates, the play was most likely performed by a troupe of child-actors possibly at court during the Christmas season.  The plot was inspired by Amphitryon from the Roman comic playwright Plautus.

Characters 

 Jack Juggler - A vice
 Jenkin Careaway - A lackey to Jack Juggler
 Master Bongrace - A gallant.
 Dame Coy - A gentlewoman
 Alice Trip and Go - A maid.

Summary

Prologue 
The prologue begins with a Latin quotation from the Distichs of Cato which it translates as, "Among thy careful business, use sometimes mirth and joy [so] that no bodily work, thy wits break or annoy." The speaker of the prologue goes on explain the importance of recreation and mirth as being restorative to the mind and introduces the following work as being based on a comedy of Plautus which will not present any serious matter, but rather be light-hearted and humorous.

Play 
Jenkin Careaway is a lazy servant who tells lies to create discord between the couple he works for, Master Bongrace and Dame Coy. Jack Juggler decides to prank Careaway by dressing in Careaway's clothes and pretending to be him. When Careaway tries to complain about the prank to his master and mistress, they do not believe him because they know he is a liar.

Date and text 
Jack Juggler was entered into the Register of the Stationers' Company ca. Nov. 1562 by the printer William Coplande. The play survives in three editions: ca. 1562, ca. 1565, and 1570, the final edition was printed by John Allde after Coplande's death in 1569.

References

External links
 

1562 plays
Comedy plays
English-language plays